Lukas Gage is an American actor. He has appeared in American Vandal, The White Lotus, You, and Euphoria.

Biography
Gage was born in San Diego, California and raised in Encinitas, California. He went to film camp every summer and acted in plays and commercials. He attended San Dieguito Academy in Encinitas.

In November 2020, Gage posted a clip of an audition on Zoom during which director Tristram Shapeero could be heard criticizing Gage's apartment, unaware that his microphone was not muted. Gage received messages of support from others in the film industry. Although he did not get the job, the rejection allowed him to accept a part on the HBO miniseries The White Lotus.

Filmography

Film

Television

References

External links
 

Living people
American male television actors
American male film actors
21st-century American male actors
People from San Diego
People from Encinitas, California
Male actors from California
Year of birth missing (living people)
LGBT male actors